Norbugang Gewog (Dzongkha: ནོར་བུ་སྒང་) is a gewog (village block) of Samtse District, Bhutan.

References

Gewogs of Bhutan
Samtse District